The Women's individual pursuit event of the 2015 UCI Track Cycling World Championships was held on 20 February 2015.

Results

Qualifying
The qualifying was held at 15:35.

Finals
The finals were started at 21:45.

References

Women's individual pursuit
UCI Track Cycling World Championships – Men's individual pursuit